Boq is a minor character in The Wonderful Wizard of Oz by L. Frank Baum. He becomes a more prominent character in Gregory Maguire's 1995 novel Wicked: The Life and Times of the Wicked Witch of the West, which purports to show the lives of some of Baum's characters from another perspective, and more prominent still in the 2003 Broadway musical Wicked which is based on Maguire's novel.

History
In Baum's The Wonderful Wizard of Oz, Boq is a rich Munchkin man who lives in the eastern quadrant of  the Land of Oz, called Munchkin Country. He gladly provides shelter for Dorothy and her dog Toto on their first night in Oz while on their journey to the Emerald City. Though the novel initially depicts Dorothy meeting only three local Munchkin men when she first encounters the Good Witch of the North upon her unexpected arrival, she does come across a lavish banquet at Boq's Munchkin mansion while on the Yellow Brick Road (consisting of his family, his closest friends and five fiddlers) celebrating the demise of the Wicked Witch of the East. They welcome Dorothy as a guest of honor and thank her for freeing them. Boq is very impressed when he sees Dorothy is wearing the charmed Silver Shoes the Wicked Witch had owned and even waits upon her himself, offering her fruit, nuts, cakes, pies and several other scrumptious treats. He is also the one who informs her that the favorite color of the Munchkin people is blue and that only good witches and sorceresses wear white. With the combination of white and faded blue checks in Dorothy's gingham dress, this implies to them that she is a friendly witch, even though Dorothy knows she is just an ordinary little girl from Kansas. After the celebration, Boq gives Dorothy and Toto a comfortable bed to sleep in. In the morning when Dorothy eats a hearty breakfast, Boq admits to Dorothy at the dining table that he has never been to the Emerald City and does not know exactly how far away that it is, for he believes that no one should ever go there unless one has business with the great and powerful Oz.

Other works

In Dorothy of Oz, Dorothy, Scarecrow, Tin Man, Cowardly Lion, and China Doll Princess arrive in the Munchkin Village where they meet up with Boq. When Dorothy tells him that Toto is a prisoner of the Jester at Princess Gaylette's castle, Boq tells Dorothy that it has been raining for several months and that much of Munchkin County is underwater enough to put the Yellow Brick Road into a state of disrepair. Boq tells the group that the secret of the Yellow Brick Road involved the Wizard of Oz having the Good Witch of the North use magical ingredients to make it where it had the color of sunlight even when it rains for a short time. Following a break in the storm, Dorothy, Scarecrow, Tin Man, Cowardly Lion, and Boq headed to where Dorothy's house landed when she first arrived in the Land of Oz. While there, the group encounters the Queen of the Field Mice who mentioned that the constant rains have forced the Field Mice out of their burrows and even detect the presence of the Wicked Witch of the East's ghost. After a part of the Yellow Brick Road is put back in place and the Wicked Witch of the East's ghost disappears, the Munchkins and the Field Mice celebrate the spell being broken as Dorothy's group boards Tugg and heads down the Munchkin River once more.

Boq in the novel Wicked
In Maguire's novel, Boq is a childhood friend of Elphaba and a classmate of hers at Shiz University, where he assists her in doing research for Doctor Dillamond. He is the point-of-view character for several chapters in a section of the book. Boq becomes friends with Crope, Tibbett, and Avaric, although he appears to be jealous of Avaric's good looks, charm, and money. His infatuation with Glinda, which never comes to more than a brief kiss, gradually lifts and they become friends. Boq eventually marries Milla, one of Galinda's classmates at Crage Hall. The two wed and return to Boq's Munchkinland farm. Elphaba encounters Boq not long after Nessarose's funeral, as she inquires after Dorothy, and again after her assault on Madame Morrible.

Boq in the musical Wicked
In the musical, Boq is the love interest of Elphaba's younger sister, Nessarose (who would later become the Wicked Witch of the East). However, the feeling is not mutual; Boq only became involved with Nessarose in hopes of impressing Galinda, on whom he truly has his heart set. Unfortunately, Galinda has so little regard for him that she cannot remember his name (calling him Biq). When Nessarose eventually becomes the governor of Munchkinland, she uses her power to enslave Boq as her personal servant. When Boq confesses his love for Glinda, Nessarose becomes extremely angry with him.  At that point, she casts a spell on him from Elphaba's spell book, the Grimmrie, but mispronounces it. This causes Boq's heart to shrink until it is completely gone. In a desperate attempt to save Boq's life, Elphaba turns Boq into the Tin Woodman. Unlike in the novel, Boq plays a considerably condensed role in the stage production.

In the original Broadway production, which opened in 2003, he was played by Christopher Fitzgerald. Originally in the West End, James Gillan played the role.

Boq in the television series Once Upon A Time
In the season 5 episode, "Our Decay" Boq has a minor appearance when the Wicked Witch, Zelena, kills him by turning him into dust to find out who told Dorothy to return to Oz to defeat her.

References

Characters in Wicked
Oz (franchise) characters
Musical theatre characters
Literary characters introduced in 1900
Male characters in literature
Fictional farmers